The Act of Tilsit was an act, signed in Tilsit by 24 members of the National Council of Lithuania Minor on November 30, 1918. Signatories demanded unification of Lithuania Minor and Lithuania Proper into a single Lithuanian state. This would mean detaching the northern areas of East Prussia, inhabited by Prussian Lithuanians, from the German Empire.

The part of East Prussia north of Neman River, the Memel Territory up to the city of Memel (Klaipėda), was detached by Polish efforts by the Treaty of Versailles and placed under the supervision of the League of Nations. The rest of East Prussia, located south of the Neman River, including the town of Tilsit, where the act was signed, remained within Germany.

The Act was not signed by the main pro-Lithuanian oriented Prussian Lithuanian leaders Wilhelm Storost and Wilhelm Gaigalat. The latter was elected as chairman of the Prussian Lithuanian Council, but refused to take the position. He was replaced by general secretary Erdmonas Simonaitis. The act was widely published in the Republic of Lithuania only rather than in Lithuania Minor. It, among other facts, suggest the act primarily being a "show" document, intended to widely present an opinion of the National Council of Lithuania Minor.

Eventually, the Act of Tilsit became an important propaganda tool during the staged Klaipėda Revolt of 1923, after which Memel Territory (Klaipėda Region) was annexed by Lithuania. In March 1939, Lithuania was forced to cede Klaipėda Region to Nazi Germany. Some of the signatories of the Tilsit Act were later persecuted by the Nazis for treason, and Simonaitis was sent to a Nazi concentration camp but survived.

References

Further reading
A.A. Gliožaitis "Tilžės akto reikšmė" ("Voruta", 1998, 1999 No 43-47) 
Algis A. Regis, "Tilžės aktas" ("Lietuvių dienos”, No 1 (361), 1986)
Petras Cidzikas "Tilžės aktas - vilties aktas" ("Voruta", No 23 (521), 2002)
Romualdas Ozolas "Tilžės aktas: alternatyvos ir imperatyvai" ("Donelaičio žemė", No 1-2, 2004)

1918 in Lithuania
Politics of Prussia
Tilsit
Lithuania Minor
November 1918 events
1918 documents